118 118 is the UK telephone number for a US owned directory enquiries provider. Once wildly popular for its advertising featuring two runners, the service has experienced a dramatic decline in calls due to easily accessible information via mobile devices. Calls are answered from call centres in the Philippines, with some administration in Cardiff, Wales and other management offices in London that provides telephone numbers, given subscriber name and address, and answers general questions on any subject. 118 118 started operation in December 2002. In September 2013 the company started 118118Money, a provider of unsecured personal loans.

118 118 is the brand name of The Number UK Ltd, a wholly owned subsidiary of US directory enquiries provider Knowledge Generation Bureau (formerly InfoNXX).

In 2006, kgb, the parent company of 118 118 in the UK, purchased rival Directory Assistance provider Conduit to produce the largest company of its type in the UK.

Allocation of number
Numbers starting with "118" were designated for commercial directory enquiries when the fixed priced 40p British Telecom directory enquiries service on 192 and 142 was discontinued. The different 118 numbers were allocated by lottery. Originally Surrey-based Leaf Telecom was allocated the 118118 number; The Number UK Ltd paid a reported £2 million to acquire it.

Products

Information services
118 118 is primarily seen as a directory enquiries service, but provides a wider range of options, not only providing numbers to users but also train times, cinema listings and directions.

In 2016, 118 118 launched a subscription service app which costs £2.48 a month for unlimited calls to the number, or £4.98 a month for unlimited calls and connections.

Calls to 118 118 cost £2.43 per minute (a minimum 60 second charge applies) inc VAT, plus your telephone company‘s network access charge. plus the access charge set by the caller's landline or mobile phone provider.

In May 2008, 118 118 introduced a service whereby customers can ask any question they want.

Ofcom regulations and pricing
 
New Ofcom regulations came into force on 1 July 2015, making all call charges to 118 numbers more transparent, consisting of an access charge and a service charge. 118 118 increased their prices on 1 March 2016 and on 1 May 2017.

The access charge is set by the caller's landline or mobile provider. It is set at the same rate as for calls to 084, 087 and 09 numbers. Including VAT, it varies between 2p and 13p per minute from landlines or between 5p and 55p per minute from mobiles.

The service charge is £2.50 per call plus 75p per minute including VAT.

Any question SMS services

In December 2008, The Number UK Ltd, purchased Texperts, which had operated in the UK since 2003. The service offered answers to questions on any topic sent via SMS text message by text message, for a charge of £3.50.

Financial services
The company's lending business 118118Money, a subsidiary of kgb, launched as an online service in September 2013. The company states they are able to extend the availability of unsecured personal loans to people who may otherwise find it difficult to borrow.

Advertising
118 118's advertising features two men with droopy moustaches, wearing items of clothing with 118 and two parallel red stripes on it. They have appeared in various forms, including 'mad professors' with crazy grey hair, and an army of 118 118 runners helping people across the nation to find businesses and services.

The 118 118 advertising was originally launched using the two men dressed as athletic runners. Used with the catchphrase "Got Your Number!", the runners' characters featured in a high-profile advertising and PR campaign leading up to deregulation in August 2003, when the original 192 directory number was switched off. This slogan has fallen into disuse by the marketing department of 118 118 because of the expansion of service beyond directory enquiries alone, but has lived on in the minds of the public. The use of the runners' characters is particularly noted for the legal action threatened, but never acted on, by 1970s record-breaking runner David Bedford. 118 118 responded to this by stating that their inspiration was partly the late American runner Steve Prefontaine. Bedford subsequently briefly worked for 118 500, a rival directory enquiries service provided by BT.

Since then they appeared in a range of guises, including spoof detectives, as the company expanded on its range of services. During this period the slogan used was "We're here to help!".

In February 2006 a new advertising campaign was launched in which the runners appeared in advertisements in the style of the television show The A-Team, using the A-Team theme tune with the number 118 sung over the music. Various routes followed, and then in early 2009 Ray Parker Junior appeared alongside the droopy moustache men singing a 118 specific version of the Ghostbusters theme tune, at one point featuring the 118 men in place of the Stay Puft Marshmallow Man from the film. In late 2009, the runners were animated, specifically promoting food and drink establishments available for booking via 118 118. This service has since been discontinued, and in 2010 this campaign was dropped in favour of comedic scenarios. In 2013 the advertising shows an army of 118 118 runners, to illustrate that the service provides the numbers of many businesses.

From March 2007, 118 118 began to sponsor ITV1 Movies.  this continued, with the two 118 characters conversing over the phone with stars from old 'B' movies. A daily cartoon strip advertising the service also ran, from 2008 to 2010, in free newspaper Metro.

The advertising strategy for 118 118 has also been used for 118 218 in France, 118 50 in Ireland, and 18 18 in Switzerland.

Criticism
In 2003, shortly after  the company started operation, it was alleged that some call centre operators cut calls short to reduce the average call time, increasing bonuses payable under an incentive scheme. Oftel and ICSTIS warned the company that it could be fined or lose its licence to operate if found to have encouraged the practice, but were satisfied that the company had moved quickly to stamp out any abuses, including dismissing some employees after investigating.

In 2008, 118 118 sent racist jokes about Asians and Pakistanis to users of its texted joke service, and complaints were made to the press. The company responded that the jokes were in breach of their standards, and apologised. Although not made public at the time, the racist jokes sent were made in response to a direct, explicit request for racist jokes. 

In December 2013 it emerged that when asked for a number of a named business, 118 118 operators often give a sales pitch suggesting that a different company offering similar services be called instead. Companies whose customers were thus referred to competitors complained about this practice. 118 118 defended this cross-selling of services, suggesting it was partly because firms had not paid to be included on its database. They said that offers were compliant with the code of practice of regulator PhonepayPlus (now Phone-paid Services Authority). However, the regulator added that a caller should receive the information requested without undue delay (chargeable as part of the call), and that unreasonably delayed callers should contact PhonepayPlus.

In 2014, failure to clearly state call costs resulted in a fine for the 118118 service.

In 2017, soaring call costs for directory enquiries services including 118118 and 118500 prompted an Ofcom review of 118 services.

References

External links
 BBCNews: Runner tries to derail 118 advert

Companies based in Cardiff
Directory assistance services